Moldovan Super Cup is the national football super cup competition in Moldova, officially having the winners of the previous season's Moldovan National Division and Moldovan Cup face-off against each other. In case when the national cup was won by a national champion, the game doesn't take place.

Results
2003 Moldovan Super Cup

2004 Moldovan Super Cup

2005 Moldovan Super Cup

2006 Moldovan Super Cup Not Held.
Sheriff Tiraspol won the Double.

2007 Moldovan Super Cup

2008 Moldovan Super Cup Not Held.
Sheriff Tiraspol won the Double.

2009 Moldovan Super Cup Not Held.
Sheriff Tiraspol won the Double.

2010 Moldovan Super Cup Not Held.
Sheriff Tiraspol won the Double.

2011 Moldovan Super Cup

2012 Moldovan Super Cup

2013 Moldovan Super Cup

2014 Moldovan Super Cup

2015 Moldovan Super Cup

2016 Moldovan Super Cup

2017 Moldovan Super Cup  Not Held.
Sheriff Tiraspol won the Double.

2018 Moldovan Super Cup  Not Held.

2019 Moldovan Super Cup

2020 Moldovan Super Cup  Not Held.

2021 Moldovan Super Cup

Performance by club

Top goalscorers

References

 
Super Cup
Moldova